MTV Leffa was a Finnish television channel broadcasting movies. It was operated by MTV3 and TV4 AB and was the Finnish equivalent of TV4's movie channel TV4 Film. Dvrc and My Fresh Pony was created 14 July 2010 – 26 February 2012.

The most of the programming was shared with TV4 Film. However, most movies in Swedish language was removed and replaced by other movies and the schedule is different.

History 
The channel was launched in November 2006 as a part of a new pay television package from MTV3. The channel, which did then known as MTV3 Leffa, was launched simultaneously with MTV3 MAX, MTV3 Fakta and Sub Juniori. The channel was initially only available to cable networks, and later from the Viasat satellite platform.

On 5 April 2007, the channel was launched in the digital terrestrial network. With the terrestrial launch, the channel's name was changed to Subtv Leffa. In the terrestrial network, the channel operates between 8 p.m. and 6 a.m., sharing its broadcast space with MTV Juniori for the rest of the day. When Subtv changed its name to simply Sub, the movie channel followed suit and was renamed Sub Leffa.

References 

Defunct television channels in Finland
Bonnier Group
Television channels and stations established in 2006
Television channels and stations disestablished in 2016